This glossary of terms used in broadcasting is a list of definitions of terms and concepts related to both radio and television broadcasting, along with the industry in general.

A

B

C

D

E

F

G

H

I

J

K

L

M

N

O

P

Q

R

S 

 Technology used to broadcast encrypted signals to be decoded by equipment owned or leased by paid subscribers, as well as the programming services thereby broadcast.

T

U

V

W–Z

See also
Glossary of journalism
Glossary of motion picture terms
Glossary of video terms

References

Generation Technologies Broadcast Video Quality Glossary , Broadcast Video Sharing Glossary 
Bitcentral Digital Broadcasting Glossary
Evertz Glossary of Technical Film and Broadcasting Terms 
Factmonster Broadcasting Glossary 
University of Delaware Radio Glossary 
Television Bureau of Advertising Glossary of Television-Related Terms

Broadcasting
Broadcasting terms
Television terminology
Terms
Broadcasting terms
Wikipedia glossaries using description lists